J-Gate is a bibliographic database to access global e-journal literature.  As a discovery platform for the research community, it is presented as a website under subscription-based access to a large database of scientific research.  It contains abstracts, citations, full-text access for all Open Access journals and other key details from academic journals by covering 71 Million+ Indexed Articles, 58,000+ Journals from over 16,000 Publishers. It gives two types of quality measure for each title; those are H-index and SJR (SCImago Journal Rank).

Overview 
It is developed and launched in 2001 by Informatics India Ltd. As a contribution to the Open Access community, Informatics initially also offered a free platform named Open J-Gate.

The current J-Gate version is categorized into 6 different top level subjects like Biomedical Sciences, Engineering & Technology, Social & Management Science, Agriculture & Biological Sciences, Arts & Humanities and Basic Sciences. J-Gate is accompanied by an extended version, named J-Gate Custom Content for Consortia, offered as a customized resource-sharing platform for Consortium members.

See also 

 List of academic databases and search engines
 Microsoft Academic Search
 Google Scholar
 South Asian Journal of Business and Management Cases

References

External links 
 J-Gate
 Informatics

Academic publishing
Electronic publishing
Bibliographic databases and indexes